Jeevika: Asia Livelihood Documentary Festival is a film festival started in January 2004 by the Centre for Civil Society, in New Delhi, India. The festival is a part of their

Jeevika Campaign which advocates for livelihood freedom for street entrepreneurs

The festival is a platform for documentaries on the issue of livelihood, to capture the challenges faced by the rural and urban poor and bring them to the attention of the public.

References

Further reading
 http://www.merinews.com/article/jeevika-showcasing-challenges-in-livelihood/15874549.shtml

Film festivals in India
Festivals in Delhi